This is a list of the stations that were established on the Nelson Section, an isolated  long railway in the Tasman district of New Zealand’s South Island.  Most stations handled passenger traffic until passenger services were withdrawn in 1954, and most also handled freight.  One, Gowanbridge, was never used in revenue service, and Kawatiri had a relatively short lifespan of only 5 years and 21 days.  All stations, other than Gowanbridge and Kawatiri, were closed along with the line on 3 September 1955.

List

See also
 Nelson Section
 Nelson Railway Society, which has the Tui railway station

References 
 
 

Rail transport in Nelson, New Zealand
Nelson